Arrastra Mountain Wilderness is a protected wilderness area centered around the Poachie Range, a northwest–southeast trending mountain range that rises to almost . Established in 1990 under the Arizona Desert Wilderness Act, the area is managed by the Bureau of Land Management Colorado River District.

Within the eastern section of the range there is the pristine Peoples Canyon.  Several springs here maintain a  chain of deep, interconnecting pools densely shaded by hundreds of sycamores, willows, and cottonwoods. The southern edge of the mountains are broken up by several isolated volcanic plugs and numerous drainages, several of which have been deeply incised into a bright orange mudstone.

To the west of the Big Sandy, the Artillery Mountains are dominated by the striking red Artillery Peak, a  volcanic plug.

Some lands in and around the wilderness are private and not federally administered.

References

Wilderness areas of Arizona
Protected areas of Mohave County, Arizona
Protected areas of Yavapai County, Arizona
Protected areas of La Paz County, Arizona
Bureau of Land Management areas in Arizona
Protected areas established in the 1990s
1990s establishments in Arizona